Mursyid Effendi (born 23 April 1972) is an Indonesian former footballer who played as a defender.

Career
Effendi played club football for Persebaya Surabaya and Persiku Kudus.

He also earned a total of five caps for the Indonesian national team.

Own goal
On 31 August 1998, while playing for Indonesia in a 1998 Tiger Cup group match against Thailand, Effendi deliberately scored an own goal to affect the outcome of the match; he was banned for life from international football by FIFA.

References

1972 births
Living people
Indonesian footballers
Indonesia international footballers
Sportspeople banned for life
Association football defenders
Persebaya Surabaya players